Brzeźce may refer to the following places:
Brzeźce, Lublin Voivodeship (east Poland)
Brzeźce, Opole Voivodeship (south-west Poland)
Brzeźce in Silesian Voivodeship (south Poland)
Kolonia Brzeźce, a settlement in Masovian Voivodeship